Oriental Orthodoxy in India is a minority that comprises millions within Christianity in India. There is major overlap between this, the Christians in Kerala and the St. Thomas Christians, the latter of whom trace themselves back to Apostle Thomas.

The Oriental Orthodox Churches in India are Malankara Orthodox Syrian Church and Jacobite Syrian Christian Church. Malabar Independent Syrian Church also follows the Oriental Orthodox tradition, but is not in communion with other churches in Oriental Orthodox family.

See also
Roman Catholicism in India
Protestantism in India

References